Abel Herrero (born October 29, 1969) is an American politician and lawyer who is a Democratic member of the Texas House of Representatives for District 34 in Nueces County.

Background
A graduate of Robstown High School, Herrero was a member of the Robstown City Council from 1999 to 2003. He received a B.A. in political science from Texas A&M University in 1993, and a J.D. from the University of Texas in 1997. Herrero has been married to his wife, Matilda, since 1993; they have five children.

Election history

Herrero has held his legislative position continuously since 2013. Previously, he was the representative from 2005 to 2011, but was defeated in the 2010 election by the Republican Connie Scott. In that election, Scott polled 13,892 (54 percent) to Herrero's 11,855 (46 percent). In November 2012, however, Herrero unseated Scott to regain the position.

Herrero was reelected to his seventh nonconsecutive term in the state House in the general election held on November 6, 2018. Wth 25,193 votes (61 percent), he defeated the Republican candidate, Chris Hale, who polled 16,045 (38.9 percent).

Legislative history
Herrero serves as the chairman of the House Committee on Criminal Jurisprudence. During his time in the House, Herrero was the Vice-Chairman of the Health and Human Services Committee, and the chairman of the Integrated Eligibility and TIERS Subcommittee. He also served on the served on the Appropriations Committee, Agriculture and Livestock Committee, Redistricting Committee, and the Defense Affairs and State-Federal Relations committees.

References

External links

Campaign website

1969 births
Living people
Democratic Party members of the Texas House of Representatives
Texas city council members
Texas A&M University alumni
Hispanic and Latino American state legislators in Texas
Hispanic and Latino American women in politics
21st-century American politicians
People from Robstown, Texas
Texas lawyers
University of Texas School of Law alumni
21st-century American women politicians